Jane Kivlin is an American ophthalmologist who specializes in the diagnosis and treatment of pediatrics genetics and strabismus.  A longstanding member of the American Association for Pediatric Ophthalmology and Strabismus, she served as President of this organization.  She is well known for her contributions to the understanding of amblyopia and the ophthalmologic manifestations of shaken baby syndrome.

Education and training
MD, Johns Hopkins University School of Medicine
Internship, Medical Center Hospital of Vermont
Residency in ophthalmology, The Wilmer Ophthalmological Institute at Johns Hopkins Hospital
Fellowship in pediatric ophthalmology, University of Miami
Fellowship in ophthalmic genetics, Johns Hopkins University

Offices held and honors
President American Association for Pediatric Ophthalmology and Strabismus, 2001-2002
Specialty Fellow, American Academy of Pediatrics
Member, International Strabismological Association
Member, Program Advisory Board, American Academy of Ophthalmology
Honor Award, American Academy of Ophthalmology
Honor Award, American Association for Pediatric Ophthalmology and Strabismus
Professor, Medical College of Wisconsin

Published works (partial list)
 Kivlin, JD. A 12-year ophthalmologic experience with the shaken baby syndrome at a regional children's hospital. Tr Am Ophth Soc XCVII:545-581, 1999.
 Kivlin JD., Simons KB., Lazoritz S., Ruttum MS., Shaken baby syndrome. Ophthalmology 107:1246-1254, 2000.
 Quinn GE., Dobson, V., Siatkowski RM., Hardy RJ., Kivlin JD., Palmer EA., Phelps DL., Repka MX., Summers CG.,
Tung B., Chan W., Does cryotherapy affect refractive error? Ophthalmology 108:343-347, 2001.

See also
pediatric ophthalmology
shaken baby syndrome

References

External links

Living people
American ophthalmologists
Pediatric ophthalmologists
American pediatricians
Women pediatricians
Medical College of Wisconsin faculty
Women ophthalmologists
Year of birth missing (living people)